Joseph Laferté (September 27, 1851 – May 1, 1930) was a farmer, merchant and political figure in Quebec. He represented Drummond in the Legislative Assembly of Quebec from 1901 to 1909 as a Liberal.

He was born in Saint-David, Canada East, the son of Antoine Théroux dit Plessis et Laferté and Angèle Vanasse. Laferté was a director of the agricultural society for Drummond County and was a school commissioner for Saint-Germain-de-Grantham in 1894 and 1895. He was first elected to the Quebec assembly in a 1901 by-election held after William John Watts resigned his seat to accept an appointment. His election in 1908 was overturned in 1909 after an appeal. Laferté was co-registrar for Drummond County from 1912 to 1916 and was mayor of Saint-Germain-de-Grantham from 1912 to 1927. He served as warden for Drummond County in 1913 and 1914.

Laferté was married three times: to Aurélie Girard in 1874, to Georgianna-Jeanne Tessier in 1879 and to Délina Tessier in 1893. His son Hector went on to serve in the Quebec assembly.

References 
 

Quebec Liberal Party MNAs
Mayors of places in Quebec
1851 births
1930 deaths